Bobby Baker is a retired NASCAR driver. He made one Winston Cup start in the 1987 First Union 400 at North Wilkesboro Speedway. He started 30th and finished 23rd. He was running at the end. He earned $3,500 in prize money. He was driving the No. 6 U.S. Racing Chevrolet fielded by D. K. Ulrich.

Motorsports career results

NASCAR
(key) (Bold – Pole position awarded by qualifying time. Italics – Pole position earned by points standings or practice time. * – Most laps led.)

Winston Cup Series

References

External links
 

NASCAR drivers
Living people
Year of birth missing (living people)
ARCA Menards Series drivers